The Sanyuanli incident was a military conflict between regular troops of the British Army and an irregular force made up of Chinese militia and local citizens that took place around Sanyuanli village on the outskirts of Canton (now Guangzhou) on the 29May 1841 after the Second Battle of Canton at the time of the First Opium War (18391842). Regarded by the British as a minor skirmish, to the Chinese it is regarded as a live example of a spontaneous uprising by the indigenous Chinese people in response to the actions of an actively aggressive invading foreign power since 1644.

Background
By the evening of the next day they had captured four Chinese forts and stood ready to attack the city walls. Instead, word arrived that the Qing authorities had agreed to British demands for compensation and the withdrawal of troops such that the planned assault was put on hold on the morning of the 27th.

Incident
Postponement of the attack left nearly 5,000 British and Indian troops milling around in the sultry heat and moist atmosphere of the paddy fields north of Canton. According to historian Frederic Wakeman, there was no question that looting took place in villages such as Sanyuanli, but on the whole, by British military standards of the time, the troops behaved well. Nevertheless, according to Chinese sources, the rape of villager Wei Shaoguang's (韋紹光) wife by a British soldier triggered the incident. Thereafter the incensed local populace, swelled by arrivals from nearby villages, grew into a crowd of 10,000 who besieged the British on all sides. Armed with machetes, pikes and a variety of swords they enticed a detachment of 60 British Sepoys into the marshy paddy fields where the latters' flintlock muskets, sodden by the heavy rain, failed to fire as the villagers attacked. Four British soldiers were killed with a further twenty or more wounded.

The British dispatched two units of marines, armed with waterproof percussion muskets, to reinforce the Sepoys. After a two-hour siege British forces withdrew to the Western Fort, only to be followed by the villagers who once more surrounded them. Once he understood the situation, the British commander passed a message to Guangzhou governor Yu Baochun (余葆纯) telling him that if the siege continued, the main force of the British Army would raze Canton to the ground. Yu, well aware that this was no empty threat given the size of the enemy forces, urged the crowd to disperse, which only led to him being branded a traitor to the people.

Legacy
With his reputation in tatters, the only post Yu Baochun could obtain was as a minor official in the department responsible for Imperial Examinations, where patriotic students would throw ink in his face.

At the epicentre of the conflict, a small hillock known as Niulangang (牛栏岗) at the side of the modern road north to Baiyun International Airport, the Guangzhou Provincial Government on 23May 1991 set up a simple concrete memorial to commemorate the 150th anniversary of the clash.

As historian Frederic Wakeman writes: "Out of the humiliating military defeats of the Opium War they have been able to extract a great popular victory, blemished only by the cowardice of Qing officials. Today, on the mainland, every child's history book contains an account of the battle. Every tablet, every shrine to the Sanyuanli dead, has been carefully tabulated by the local history bureau of the province: a Bunker Hill and an Alamo rolled into one."

Notes

References 

Bibliography

 

 

 

1841 in China
Battles of the First Opium War
Conflicts in 1841
Guangzhou
May 1841 events